Medinipur Assembly constituency is an assembly constituency in Paschim Medinipur district in the Indian state of West Bengal.

Overview
As per orders of the Delimitation Commission, No. 236 Medinipur Assembly constituency is composed of the following: Midnapore municipality, Chandra, Dherua, Monidaha and Tantigeria gram panchayats of Midnapore Sadar community development block and Bankibandh, Garhmal, Karnagarh, Kashijora and Shatpati gram panchayats of Salboni community development block.

Medinipur Assembly constituency is part of No. 34 Medinipur (Lok Sabha constituency).

Members of Legislative Assembly

Election results

2021

2016

2011

1977-2006
In the 2006 state assembly elections, Santosh Rana of CPI won the 223 Midnapore assembly seat defeating his nearest rival Rama Prasad Tewary of Trinamool Congress. Contests in most years were multi cornered but only winners and runners are being mentioned. Purnendu Sengupta of CPI defeated Gouri Ghosh of Trinamool Congress in 2001, and Dinen Roy of Congress in 1996. Kamakhya Ghosh of CPI defeated Raj Kumar Mishra of Congress in 1991, Samir Roy of Congress in 1987, and Samir Roy of ICS in 1982. Bankim Behari Pal of Janata Party defeated Kamakhya Ghosh of CPI in 1977.

1957-1972
Biswanath Mukherjee of CPI won in 1972 and 1971. Kamakhya Charan Ghosh of CPI won in 1969 and 1967. Syed Shamsul Bari of Congress won in 1962. Anjali Khan of Congress won in 1957.

References

Assembly constituencies of West Bengal
Politics of Paschim Medinipur district